Weser-Aue is a Samtgemeinde ("collective municipality") in the district of Nienburg, in Lower Saxony, Germany. Its seat is in the village Marklohe. It was established on 1 November 2021 by the merger of the former Samtgemeinden Marklohe and Liebenau.

The Samtgemeinde Weser-Aue consists of the following municipalities:
 Balge 
 Binnen 
 Liebenau 
 Marklohe
 Pennigsehl
 Wietzen

References

Samtgemeinden in Lower Saxony
Nienburg (district)